WJHV-LP (95.1 FM) is a radio station licensed to Fairbury, Illinois, United States, and serving the Bloomington area. The station is currently owned by Faith Fellowship Ministries, Inc.

References

External links
 

JHV-LP
JHV-LP
Fairbury, Illinois